Nalanda College is a leading Buddhist school in Sri Lanka where provides primary and secondary education for Sri Lankan boys. The school was established by P. de S. Kularatne as an offshoot of Ananda College Colombo and was registered as a separate school on 1 November 1925.

History
In 1922 a section of Ananda College was moved to Campbell Place, Colombo on a proposal made by Patrick de Silva Kularatne, a leading Buddhist educationist of the time. L. H. Mettananda was appointed as the principal of this institution which was called as Ananda branch. W. E. Fernando was the headmaster and Balangoda Ananda Maitreya Thera became its first Buddhist teacher.
In 1924 Kularatne has spent Rs. 5,500 to purchase a quarter acre of land close to the Campbell Place playground and built 16 classrooms for the new school. Governor Gregory Thompson laid the foundation stone for a building to have 16 classrooms. Out of 16 classrooms, he has used two rooms for the principal's office and staff members another two rooms for the laboratories and the balance of 12 rooms for the classes. Three hundred and thirty students of Ananda were transferred under L. H. Mettananda in 1924.

Kularatne was instrumental in getting the institution registered as a separate school on 1 November 1925. The new school was given its motto Apadana Sobhini Panna, and the school name Nalanda was also proposed by Ven. Balangoda Ananda Maitreya Thero. The English and the Sinhala versions are "Character illumines Wisdom" and "Yahapath Charithayen Praggnawa Opanangwe" respectively. Balangoda Ananda Maitreya Thera has selected this motto from the Anguttara Nikaya, Tika Nipatha, Bala Waggo Lakkana Sutta.

On 1 January 1926 Kularatne appointed Dr Gunapala Malalasekara as principal of the Nalanda College and transferred L. H. Metthanada to Ananda College as vice principal.  Nalanda was fortunate in having its second principal, Gunapala Piyasena Malalasekera. Malasekara launched several projects, making plans for the collection of funds for the construction of buildings, and later commenced a bulletin titled "NALANDA". Also arranged 15-minute Buddhist talks at the daily students' assembly and took many steps to promote the Buddhist environment in the school.

Kularatne laid the foundation stone for the second building on 30 March 1926. By the end of 1926, the number of students had increased to 550. Later he borrowed money from Anagarika Dharmapala to purchase land for the primary section which was settled by Malasekara. The student assembly hall is named Malalasekara Theatre after him.

Evolution

The college is equipped with facilities such as science and computer laboratories, lecture halls, auditoriums, and hostels. The main medium of education at Nalanda is Sinhala while students have the option to select English from year six onwards. Nalandians have excelled academically, achieving high grades at Ordinary Level and Advanced Level exams and also in sports.

In 2011 Nalandian students won first place in the world at the Oracle Thinkquest Application Development and first place for International Students Biotechnology Competition and the 14th International Convention on Students Quality Control Circles, held in Lucknow, India. Students of Nalanda College Colombo also have excelled in research activities. In 2017 a student of Research Forum won a silver medal for his research, Deposition of air pollutants on pollen grains and occurrence of respiration allergies among humans at the International Conference of Young Scientists in Germany, where Sri Lanka participated for the first time at the event as a competitive country.

Awards

At Nalanda College Colombo there are many endowed prizes and awards to felicitate its students who achieve immensely in education, sports and other extracurricular activities. Felicitation ceremonies are conducted each year.

 Annual Prize Giving - all Nalandians who gained unique academic achievements in education are felicitated.
 Annual Colours Awarding Ceremony - Ceremony to felicitate students who performed and achieved national and international victories during a year.
 International Awarding Ceremony - Ceremony to award students who gained high recognition in the international arena.
 Nalanda Puthra Abhinandana Award – Service to the nation awarded to M. J. Perera in 1992.
 Nalanda Keerthi Sri - Dr. Jayaweerage Samantha was the founder of the Nalanda Keerthi Sri Award Festival. As the media Secretary of the Nalanda College Old Scouts' Association (2003–2004), the first edition occurred on 27 September 2003. The award is aimed at recognising alumni who have excelled in their respective professions and thereby contribute to the school's legacy and enhance the morale of its students.

Award recipients include: Kala Keerthi Dr Henry Jayasena, President of Sri Lanka Mahinda Rajapaksa, Diyawadana Nilame Pradeep Nilanga Dela Bandara, Sri Lanka Ranjana Dr Sarath Gunapala, Professor Chandana Jayaratne, Kuppiyawatta Bodhananda Thera, Dr Gunadasa Amarasekara, Professor Pathmajeewa Ganepola, Professor K. N. O. Dharmadasa, Air Chief Marshal Gagan Bulathsinghala, Air Chief Marshal Kapila Jayampathy, Air Chief Marshal Sumangala Dias.

Clubs and societies

 Aeronautical Society
 Adventure Club
 Nalanda College Astronomical Society
 Amadhyapa Sangamaya
 Agriculture Society
 Archaeological Society
 Buddhist Association
 Cinema Club
 Communication Unit
 Computer Society
 Commerce Society
 Dancing Circle

 Drama Society
 English Debating Society
 English Literary Association
 English Drama Circle
 Environmental Society
 Interact Club
 Leo Club
 Life Saving Club
 Model United Nations
 Paranormal Investigation and Research Club
 Prefects Guild
 Photographic & Art Society

 Quiz Club
 Road Safety Unit
 Saukyadana Unit (Health Club)
 Scrabble Club
 Science Society
 Scouts Troop
 Shakespeare Drama Society
 Social Services Association
 Sinhala Literary & Art Society
 Sinhala Oratory & Debating Society
 Saukyadana Unit
 United Nations Club
 Western Music Association
 Wild Life & Environmental Conservation Society

Sports
Nalanda College occupy a playground at Campbell Place, a modern sports complex, a modern squash court, swimming pool, shooting range and other sports facilities.

 Athletics
 Archery
 Badminton
 Baseball
 Basketball
 Boxing
 Cadet Platoon
 Cadet Band

 Cricket
 Chess
 Gymnastics
 Hockey
 Martial Arts – Karate, Wushu 
 Rugby Football
 Rowing

 Rifle Shooting
 Soccer (Football)
 Squash
 Swimming
 Tennis
 Volleyball
 Water Polo
 Table Tennis

Cricket

Battle of the Maroons

The Ananda versus Nalanda cricket match is played between Ananda College, Colombo and Nalanda College Colombo since 1924. Over the years Nalanda College has produced many world-famous cricketers such as Bandula Warnapura, Roshan Mahanama, Kumar Dharmasena, Mahela Jayawardena.

Nalanda v Trinity

The annual cricket match between Nalanda College Colombo and Trinity College, Kandy is played for the Mahela-Sanga Trophy.

Principals

Notable teachers
Nalanda College has had a number of notable teachers in tutorial staff including: Balangoda Ananda Maitreya Mahanayake Thero, Polwatte Buddhadatta Mahanayake Thero, S. Mahinda Thero, A. T. Ariyaratne, Sagara Palansuriya, Edward Jayakody, Premasara Epasinghe, S. Panibharatha and Siri Perera

Alumni

Past students who have studied at Nalanda College Colombo are referred to as Old Nalandians.

War Memorial and remembrance
Each year students and alumni commemorate the loss of 41 alumni who died in the Sri Lankan civil war. A war memorial is situated between the main oldest buildings of the college.

Nalanda College Junior Old Boys' Association

The Association is the alumni association for the college. Its objective is to enhance the interests of the college, past students and present students by maintaining relationships among alumni and with their alma mater. Each year the union organises many events such as Future Minds, Nalanda Walk, Olcott Memorial old boys cricket tourney, Ranaviru Upahara, etc.

See also
 Education in Sri Lanka

References

External links
 Nalanda College Colombo Sri Lanka
 The Digital Education Project of Nalanda College
 Nalanda Junior Old Boys' Association
 Nalanda College Old Boys' Association
 Battle of the Maroons
 Future Minds

 
1925 establishments in Ceylon
Boys' schools in Sri Lanka
Buddhist schools in Sri Lanka
Educational institutions established in 1925
National schools in Sri Lanka
Schools in Colombo